Urban Search and Rescue Ohio Task Force 1 or OH-TF1 is a FEMA Urban Search and Rescue Task Force based in Dayton, Ohio. OH-TF1 is sponsored by the municipalities in the Miami Valley.

Deployment 
The following list may be incomplete, especially between 2008 and 2018:
 1998 - Debruce Grain Elevator Explosion
 2001 - World Trade Center
 2002 - Salt Lake City Winter Olympic Games
 2003 - Columbia Space Shuttle Debris Recovery
 2003 - Hurricane Isabel
 2004 - Democratic National Convention
 2004 - Hurricane Frances
 2004 - Hurricane Ivan
 2005 - Hurricane Dennis
 2005 - Hurricane Katrina
 2005 - Hurricane Ophelia
 2005 - Hurricane Rita
 2006 - Hurricane Ernesto
 2008 - Hurricane Gustav
 2008 - Hurricane Hanna
 2008 - Hurricane Ike
 2011 - Hurricane Irene
 2012 - Hurricane Sandy
 2016 - Hurricane Matthew
 2018 - Hurricane Florence
 2018 - Hurricane Michael
 2019 - Hurricane Dorian
 2020 - Hurricane Laura
 2021 - Surfside condominium building collapse

References 

Ohio 1
Government of Ohio